Kaikini  is a village in the southern state of Karnataka, India. It is located in the Bhatkal taluk of Uttara Kannada district in Karnataka. One of the ancient temple, Shree Shivamuneeshwara Shantadurga Temple, established in the year 1752, is situated in Kaikini. Every year the Navratri festival is celebrated there.

Demographics
As of 2001 India census, Kaikini had a population of 9293 with 4518 males and 4775 females.

See also
 Uttara Kannada
 Mangalore
 Districts of Karnataka

References

External links
 

Villages in Uttara Kannada district